Thomas Justis House is a historic home located near Wilmington, New Castle County, Delaware. The original section was built between 1804 and 1816, as a stuccoed stone, two-story, three-bay, gable-roofed building laid out on a double pile, side passage plan. About 1900, a frame, two-story, two bay, gable-roofed wing was built on the northeast endwall. With the addition, the house gained the appearance of a five-bay, center door dwelling.  The house is in a vernacular Federal style.

It was added to the National Register of Historic Places in 1993.

References

Houses on the National Register of Historic Places in Delaware
Federal architecture in Delaware
Houses completed in 1816
Houses in Wilmington, Delaware
1816 establishments in Delaware
National Register of Historic Places in Wilmington, Delaware